Ferdinand of Bavaria was born 20 January 1550, in Landshut, in the Duchy of Bavaria, and died 30 January 1608 in Munich, at the age of 58. He was the second surviving son of Albert V, Duke of Bavaria, and his wife Archduchess Anna of Austria, and consequently was prepared for a military career. Ferdinand is also known for the two extraordinary diaries he kept, one as fifteen-year-old boy on a journey from Munich to Florence, for his aunt's wedding, and a second journey to Florence, this time as young and experienced man of affairs.

Youth

In 1565, the 15-year-old Ferdinand made a widely publicized journey to Florence, to attend the wedding of his maternal aunt, Johanna of Austria, to Francesco I de' Medici, and to visit with other maternal aunts in the city. Johanna's marriage to the Medici was a politically expedient one: she was expected to produce heirs. The groom's mistress, whom he married after the death of his wife in 1579, was already well-established in 1565: this was a political marriage, and an extravagant one, and cost Duke Cosimo, father of the groom, over 60,000 ducats, a phenomenal sum.

Sending a teen-aged boy into the hot-house of Medici intrigue might have seemed questionable to the sober-minded Wittelsbachs. Albert had supported whole-heartedly the Catholic Counter-Reformation; Jesuits were entrenched at the Jesuit College of Ingolstadt, and had raised his children accordingly. Ferdinand's older brother earned for himself the sobriquet "the Pius" for his melancholy demeanor, his ardent attachment to prayer and meditation, and, more obviously, for his eschewal of hunting, dancing, and other frivolities that dominated social life in a 16th-century court.

The Emperor chided his father on sending his second son, not sending William, heir to the duchy, but Albert pointed out that he was not able, on such short notice, to put together an appropriate entourage for the heir; the second son would have to do. Ferdinand's entourage was no mean affair. His chief financial adviser, Hanns Jakob Fugger, served as chief steward on the journey, and Fugger's son as Ferdinand's cup-bearer.   They traveled by horse, sledge (sled), boat, and carriage in the journey that took four months, from Munich to Florence and back to Munich, and throughout the entire journey, Ferdinand maintained a journal, unusually written in the third person, about his adventure. Through Ferdinand's eyes, via his journal, we have an unusual picture of mid-16th century masquerades, musical performances, and comedies, the experience of which Ferdinand brought with him when he returned to Munich in February of the following year.

On another journey, as a guest of the emperor in Vienna, he recorded the near riot during the Corpus Christi procession of 1578. As he and the archdukes Ferdinand and Maximilian heard the mass, the population harassed the celebrant priests, and interfered with the conduct of the procession itself.

Career
His younger brother, Ernst, was elected to the Archbishopric of Cologne, in 1583, as part of the conflict over the control of the electoral see. Ferdinand took command of his brother's army during the Cologne War; his able management of the army, plus the support of troops from the Duke of Alba in the Spanish Netherlands, secured the electoral dignity for his brother, and consolidated the family's place in imperial politics.

Personal life

Ferdinand made a morganatic marriage with Maria Pettenbeck on 26 September 1588. The 16 children of this marriage were raised to the status of Counts and Countesses of Wartenberg. The line died out in 1736. Since then the title has also been used by various members of the Royal House of Bavaria.

Maria Maximiliane, Countess, Nun in Munich's Riedler Regelhaus, 1589-1638
Maria Magdalena, Countess, Nun in Munich's Riedler Regelhaus 1590–1620
Maria Magdalena von Wartenberg, 1592–1598
Franz Wilhelm, Count of Wartenberg, Bischop of Osnabruck 1593–1661
Maria Anna of Wartenberg, Nun in Kuhbach Benedictine Cloister, 1594–1629
Sebastian of Wartenberg 1595–1596
Ernst of Wartenberg 1596–1597
Maximillian, Count of Wartenberg 1602–1679
Ernst Benno, Count of Wartinberg 1605–1606
Maria Katharina of Wartenberg, 1605–1606
Ferdinand Lorenz, Count of Wartenberg 1606–1666
Maria Klara Theresia of Wartenberg 1608–1635

He is buried in the cathedral in Munich, Bavaria.

His surviving siblings were

William V, Duke of Bavaria 1548–1626
Maria Anna of Bavaria, 1551–1608, married her uncle, Charles II, archduke of Austria, and was the mother of Ferdinand II, Holy Roman Emperor
Maximiliana Maria of Bavaria, 1553–1614

Ernst of Bavaria, Elector of Cologne, 1554–1612

Ancestry

Citations

Bavarian nobility
Dukes of Germany
House of Wittelsbach
1550 births
1608 deaths
German people of the Eighty Years' War
German travel writers
German male non-fiction writers
Burials at Munich Frauenkirche
Sons of monarchs